A list of science fiction films released in the 1960s. These 190 films include core elements of science fiction, but can cross into other genres. They have been released to a cinema audience by the commercial film industry and are widely distributed with reviews by reputable critics. Collectively, the science fiction films from the 1960s received five Academy Awards, a Hugo Award and a BAFTA Award.

List

See also
 History of science fiction films

Notes

References

1960s
Lists of 1960s films by genre